Sir Edwin Ronald Nixon  (21 June 1925 – 17 August 2008) was an eminent  British  business leader who headed IBM's operations in the country for over 20 years.

Born in 1925, he was educated at Alderman Newton's School, Leicester, and Selwyn College, Cambridge. After a spell at  Dexion, he joined IBM UK in 1955 and was successively managing director,  chairman, and chief executive before becoming chairman of  Amersham International in 1988. A former deputy lieutenant of Hampshire, he died in 2008.

References

1925 births
People educated at Alderman Newton's School, Leicester
Alumni of Selwyn College, Cambridge
IBM employees
English chief executives
Commanders of the Order of the British Empire
Knights Bachelor
Businesspeople awarded knighthoods
2008 deaths
20th-century English businesspeople